Disparctia thomensis is a moth species of the family Erebidae. It was described by James John Joicey and George Talbot in 1926. It is found on São Tomé Island off the western equatorial coast of Central Africa.

References

Further reading
Joicey, J. J. & Talbot, G. (1926). "New forms of Lepidoptera from the island of Sao Tomé, West Africa". Entomologist. 59 (759): 220–22.

Spilosomina
Moths described in 1926
Moths of São Tomé and Príncipe